The 2022 Rome ePrix was a pair of Formula E electric car races held at the Circuito Cittadino dell'EUR in the EUR residential and business district of the Italian capital of Rome on 9 and 10 April 2022. It served as the fourth and fifth rounds of the 2021–22 Formula E season, and marked the fourth edition of the event. Mitch Evans gained a total of 11 positions across the two races to claim double victory, with Robin Frijns and Stoffel Vandoorne following through in race one and Jean-Éric Vergne and Frijns completing the podium in race two.

Classification

Race one

Qualifying

Qualifying duels

Overall classification 

Notes:
  – Sérgio Sette Câmara received a 3-place grid penalty for speeding under red flag.

Race

Notes:
  – Pole position.
  – Fastest lap.
  – Edoardo Mortara and Jake Dennis received a 5-second time penalty each for causing a collision.
  – Sérgio Sette Câmara, Antonio Giovinazzi and Dan Ticktum all received a 5-second time penalty for a safety car infringement. Giovinazzi also received a post-race drive-through penalty converted into a 30-second time penalty for exceeding the full course yellow speed and gaining an advantage.

Race two

Qualifying

Qualifying duels

Overall classification 

Notes:
  – Nyck de Vries received a 3-place grid penalty for causing a collision in race one.

Race

Notes:
  – Pole position.
  – Fastest lap.
  – Lucas di Grassi received a 5-second time penalty for causing a collision.
  – António Félix da Costa received a 5-second time penalty for forcing another driver off the track and causing a collision.
  – Nyck de Vries received a 10-second time penalty for causing a collision.
  – Oliver Askew received two 5-second time penalties, one for overtaking under the safety car and the other for causing a collision.

Notes

References

|- style="text-align:center"
|width="35%"|Previous race:2022 Mexico City ePrix
|width="30%"|FIA Formula E World Championship2021–22 season
|width="35%"|Next race:2022 Monaco ePrix
|- style="text-align:center"
|width="35%"|Previous race:2021 Rome ePrix
|width="30%"|Rome ePrix
|width="35%"|Next race:2023 Rome ePrix
|- style="text-align:center"

2022
2021–22 Formula E season
2022 in Italian motorsport
April 2022 sports events in Italy